"Dirty Laundry" is a song written by Don Henley and Danny Kortchmar, from Henley's debut solo album I Can't Stand Still, released in 1982. The song hit number 1 on the Billboard Top Album Tracks chart in October 1982, prior to being issued as a 45 rpm single. Lyrically, the song describes mass media sensationalism.

Released as the second single from I Can't Stand Still, it spent three weeks at number 3 on the Billboard Hot 100 in early 1983.  The single was certified Gold by the Recording Industry Association of America in March 1983, representing sales of a million copies in the United States.

History
The song is about the callousness of TV news reporting as well as the tabloidization of all news. Henley sings from the standpoint of a news anchorman who "could have been an actor, but I wound up here". The song's theme is that TV news coverage focuses too much on negative and sensationalist news; in particular, deaths, disasters, and scandals, with little regard to the consequences or for what is important ("We all know that crap is king"). The song was inspired by the intrusive press coverage surrounding the deaths of John Belushi and Natalie Wood, and Henley's own arrest in 1980 when he was charged with contributing to the delinquency of a minor and possession of marijuana, cocaine, and Quaaludes after paramedics treated a 16-year-old female who was suffering from drug intoxication at his Los Angeles home.

Among the musicians on the record were Timothy B. Schmit and Joe Walsh, two of Henley's bandmates of the Eagles. Walsh performs the first guitar solo, followed by Steve Lukather of the band Toto; the guitar basic tracks are played by Danny Kortchmar who also helped Henley compose this song. The sleeve notes also mention musicians George Gruel, Roger Linn and Steve Porcaro.

Personnel 
 Don Henley – lead vocals, backing vocals
 Steve Porcaro –  keyboards, special keyboard effects
 Roger Linn – special effects
 Danny Kortchmar –  rhythm guitar, backing vocals
 Joe Walsh – 1st guitar solo
 Steve Lukather – 2nd guitar solo
 Timothy B. Schmit – bass, backing vocals
 Jeff Porcaro – drums
 George Gruel – backing vocals

Chart performance

Weekly charts

Year-end charts

Certifications

See also
Don Henley discography
List of Billboard Mainstream Rock number-one songs of the 1980s
Narcotizing dysfunction
Yellow journalism

References

External links
 Lyrics of this song

1982 singles
Don Henley songs
Lisa Marie Presley songs
Nickelback songs
RPM Top Singles number-one singles
Songs written by Don Henley
Songs written by Danny Kortchmar
Songs about television
1982 songs
Asylum Records singles
Republic Records singles
Criticism of journalism
Songs about the media